The School of Fine Arts of Casablanca is a fine arts school established in 1919 in Casablanca, Morocco. It was the origin of the nativist modernist Casablanca School art movement led by faculty members Farid Belkahia, Mohamed Melehi, and Mohamed Chabâa in the 1960s.

History 
The institution was founded in 1919 by a French Orientalist painter named Édouard Brindeau de Jarny, who started his career teaching drawing at Lycée Lyautey. In the beginning, students learned applied arts for architecture, interior design, decoration, and architectural landscaping, in addition to drawing, painting, art history, and math. The school also hosted  (open workshops) for European and Moroccan artists and craftsmen, as well as students and instructors from other institutions. Abdeslam Ben Larbi el Fassi, whom  described as "the first Modern Moroccan artist," was one of the school's first students.

The school was overseen by the municipality chief, four members of the municipal council, and the director of Lycée Lyautey. They chose the rules, appointed the director, and required that all instructors held French nationality. A small number of sons of Moroccan notables were admitted, and they were not allowed to participate in any exhibitions without his consent. The school promoted itself by advertising that graduates could become "art instructors, advertising designers, interior decorators, typesetters, and builders of maquettes." In his book Art in the Service of Colonialism, Hamid Irbouh writes that Moroccan students were trained  to become "technicians to assist French architects." It pushed Moroccan students toward becoming master craftsmen, studying ceramics, architectural drafting, and interior decoration, while pushing French students toward fine arts and to apply to Écoles des Beaux-Arts in France.

Casablanca School 
Farid Belkahia became the director of the School of Fine Arts of Casablanca in 1962. From 1964 to 1972, the Nativist Casablanca School, composed of Belkahia and faculty members Mohammed Melehi and Mohamed Chabâa, worked toward what Belkahia described as a "democratization" of the art curriculum. The curriculum incorporated heavy use of local traditional crafts in their art and worked with their instructors on projects. According to Salah M. Hassan, the Casablanca school "saw itself as the artistic conscience of the time. It criticized the politics of dependency on foreign cultural missions, at that time the patrons of Moroccan modern art."

In 1969, the Casablanca School held an  entitled "" in the Jemaa el-Fnaa of Marrakesh, displaying their work in public.

Notable faculty 
Notable faculty members of the School of Fine Arts of Casablanca:

 Farid Belkahia
 Mohamed Melehi
 Mohamed Chabâa

Notable alumni 
Notable alumni of the School of Fine Arts of Casablanca include:

 Abdelakabir Faradjallah of the band, Attarazat Addahabia
Malika Agueznay
 Meryem Aboulouafa
Ikram Kabbaj
 Majida Khattari (diploma in 1988)

References 

Art schools in Morocco
French colonial empire
Buildings and structures in Casablanca
1919 establishments in Morocco
20th-century architecture in Morocco